Carl Austin Weiss Sr. (December 6, 1906 – September 8, 1935) was an American physician from Baton Rouge, Louisiana, who assassinated U.S. Senator Huey Long at the Louisiana State Capitol on September 8, 1935.

Career
Weiss was born in Baton Rouge to physician Carl Adam Weiss and the former Viola Maine. Weiss's father was a prominent ophthalmologist who had once treated Senator Long. His family was Catholic; his father was of German descent, and his mother had French and Irish ancestry. Weiss was educated in local schools and graduated from St. Vincent's Academy. He then obtained his bachelor's degree in 1925 from Louisiana State University in Baton Rouge. He did postgraduate work in Vienna, Austria, and briefly practiced at the American Hospital of Paris. 

Weiss thereafter was awarded internships in Vienna and at Bellevue Hospital in New York City. It was while in Europe that Weiss bought a FN Model 1910 pistol for $25 (equivalent to approximately $ in ) that he allegedly used in the Long assassination.

In 1932, he returned to Baton Rouge to enter private practice with his father. He was president of the Louisiana Medical Society in 1933 and a member of the Kiwanis International.

The Pavy-Opelousas connection
In 1933, Weiss married Yvonne Louise Pavy (1908–1963) of Opelousas, the seat of St. Landry Parish. The couple had one son, Carl Austin Weiss Jr., who was born in 1934, shortly before his father's death, and he died August 2, 2019. Pavy was the daughter of Judge Benjamin Henry Pavy (1874–1943) and Ida Veazie (died 1941). The Pavy family was part of an anti-Long political faction. Judge Pavy's brother Felix Octave Pavy (1879–1962), a physician in Leonville and Opelousas, had run for lieutenant governor in 1928 on an intraparty ticket, and had been defeated by Paul N. Cyr, a Jeanerette dentist who was endorsed by Long.

Similarly, Judge Pavy, Weiss's father-in-law, was the Sixteenth Judicial District Court state judge from St. Landry and Evangeline parishes. He did not seek reelection in 1936, after Long had the legislature gerrymander the seat to include a majority of pro-Long voters within a revised district.

Murder of Huey Long

On Sunday, September 8, 1935, Carl Weiss confronted and shot Huey Long in the Capitol building in Baton Rouge. At 9:20 p.m., just after passage of the bill effectively removing Judge Pavy, Weiss approached Long, and, according to the generally accepted version of events, fired a single shot with a handgun from four feet (1.2 m) away. Long was struck in the torso. Long's bodyguards, nicknamed the "Cossacks" or "skullcrushers", responded by firing at Weiss with their own pistols, killing him; an autopsy found that Weiss had been shot more than 60 times by Long's bodyguards.

Alternative theories and denials of the assassination

In the years since the event, theories have arisen that Weiss did not actually murder Senator Long; with some speculating that Long was, in fact, killed by a stray bullet fired from the gun of one of his bodyguards.

Family denials
At the time, Weiss's wife and their families did not accept his guilt. Indeed, Weiss's parents indicated that he had seemed quite happy earlier on the day that Long was killed. Many people close to the family, as well as politicians of the time, doubted the official version of the shooting.

Weiss's son, Carl Jr., an infant at the time of his father's death, had since vigorously disputed the assertion. In a 1993 interview on the NBC program Unsolved Mysteries, he asserted that Long was accidentally shot by one of his own bodyguards. Donald Pavy, a medical doctor and first cousin of Weiss's wife Yvonne Pavy, conducted a scientific study of the case and concluded in his book Accident and Deception: The Huey Long Shooting that Weiss did not shoot the governor-turned-senator.

However, this view is not accepted by Louisiana State University Professor, T. Harry Williams, who writes in his Pulitzer Prize-winning biography of Long:

Williams then goes on to say that:

Exhumation
With the approval of the family, the remains of Weiss were exhumed in 1991 and examined by James Starrs to attempt to determine if Weiss was the actual killer of Long. Starrs was also the publisher of the Scientific Sleuthing Review.

Portrayal in literature
The character of Adam Stanton in Robert Penn Warren's fictitious All the King's Men is partially based on Weiss.

In her 1993 memoir, Marguerite Young mentions the murder of Huey Long and how she used to dance with Weiss as a college girl at Louisiana State University.

Connection to Ernest Hemingway
Nobel laureate Ernest Hemingway suffered a severe gash to his forehead when a skylight fell on him in March 1928 in his Paris apartment. He was treated at the American Hospital of Paris, and it took  nine stitches to suture his head wound. He was left with a permanent, prominent scar on his forehead. 

Later in life, Hemingway claimed that the physician who treated him was Carl Weiss. However, Hemingway was almost certainly mistaken, as Weiss did not start practicing at the hospital until July 1929, sixteen months after Hemingway was treated for his head wound.

Footnotes
1.As both men died before a trial could be held, this was never proven in court. Likewise, no autopsy was ever performed on Long.

References
Conrad, Glenn R. 1988. A Dictionary of Louisiana Biography. Lafayette: Louisiana Historical Association.
Richard D. White Jr., Kingfish (New York: Random House), pp. 258–259.
Douglas H. Ubelaker, 1997. Taphonomic Applications in Forensic Anthropology. In: Haglund, W.D. & Sorg, M.H. (eds): Forensic Taphonomy: The Postmortem Fate of Human Remains. CRC Press, pp.: 77-90; Boca Raton.
Williams, T.H., 1969, Huey Long, New York: Alfred A. Knopf Inc.
Gremillion, E.A., 2011 Did Carl Weiss shoot Huey Long?

External links
 C-SPAN program Death of Huey Long

1906 births
1935 deaths
American assassins
Physicians from Louisiana
Burials in Louisiana
People from Baton Rouge, Louisiana
Tulane University alumni
Louisiana State University alumni
Deaths by firearm in Louisiana
Huey Long